Daniel Pereira may refer to:

Daniel Pereira (footballer, born 1976), Argentine-Uruguayan footballer
Daniel Pereira (footballer, born 2000), Venezuelan footballer
Daniel Pereira Dos Santos Cabral (1924–2008), Portuguese Anglican bishop

See also
Daniel Pereyra (born 1962), Uruguayan modern pentathlete